Andre Diego Fagan (born 16 July 1987) is a Jamaican footballer who plays as a forward for the V.League 1 club Hải Phòng.

References

Living people
1987 births
Association football forwards
Jamaican footballers
Jamaican expatriate footballers
Jamaican expatriate sportspeople in Vietnam
Sportspeople from Kingston, Jamaica
Harbour View F.C. players
Expatriate footballers in Vietnam
V.League 1 players
Song Lam Nghe An FC players
Haiphong FC players